Gulmohar is a Marathi film released on 27 February 2009. The movie was produced by Uttam Jhavar and directed by Gajendra Ahire.

Cast 
 Sonali Kulkarni as Vidya
 Rajit Kapur as Deven
 Jeetendra Joshi as Dr.Bhagwan Satpute
 Mohan Agashe
 Girija Oak
 Sandesh Kulkarni

Soundtrack
Roop Kumar Rathod directed the film's music.

References

External links
 

2009 films
2000s Marathi-language films
Films directed by Gajendra Ahire